Randy Hippeard (born December 6, 1985) is an American football quarterback who is currently a free agent. He was signed by the Winterthur Warriors of Nationalliga A in Switzerland as an undrafted free agent in 2009. He played college football at University of Virginia's College at Wise.

Early life
Hippeard attended Colonial Forge High School in Stafford, Virginia. Hippeard played both football and baseball at Colonial Forge. As a junior in 2002, Hippeard threw for 1,503 yards and 13 touchdown passes. As a senior in 2003, he threw for 2,223 yards and 22 touchdown passes.

College career
Hippeard chose to continue his football career at the University of Virginia's College at Wise. Hippeard started every game for the Cavaliers except the final three of his freshman season. He earned Victory Sports Network NAIA Honorable Mention All-American honors in 2006 and 2007 and CollegeFanz Sports Network NAIA Honorable Mention All-American honors in 2008. Hippeard set 24 single-season records for the Cavaliers and finished with the 4th most passing yards in NAIA history when his career ended. In 2014, he was inducted into the Virginia–Wise Highland Cavaliers Athletics Hall of Fame.

Statistics
Hippeard's college statistics are as follows:

Professional career
Hippeard was rated the 85th best quarterback in the 2009 NFL Draft by NFLDraftScout.com.

Winterthur Warriors
In 2009-2010, Hippeard signed and played for the Winterthur Warriors of the Nationalliga A (American football) in Switzerland. 
With the Warriors he played for his former college head coach Bill Ramseyer during both seasons.
Hippeard was the starting quarterback. He helped lead the Warriors to the semi finals of the Nationalliga A (American football) 
playoffs in 2009, losing to the Calanda Broncos.

Columbus Lions
In 2012, Hippeard played for the Columbus Lions of the Professional Indoor Football League (PIFL). Through 7 games, Hippeard was the leading passer in the PIFL. Hippeard was named Second Team All-PIFL for his play.

Knoxville NightHawks
In 2013, Hippeard signed with the Knoxville NightHawks and was named their starting quarterback.

Tampa Bay Storm

On April 18, 2013, Hippeard was assigned to the Tampa Bay Storm. Hippeard saw limited action during his first 9 games with the Storm, serving as the backup to Adrian McPherson. On June 22, 2013, Hippeard made his first career start for the Storm when McPherson was placed on injured reserve. Hippeard and the Storm fell 49–50 to the Chicago Rush in his first career start, with Hippeard 315 yards passing and 6 touchdowns. Hippeard started the next 3 games for the Storm, but the Storm lost all four of Hippeards starts in 2013, and he was benched in favor of Shane Boyd.
In 2014, Hippeard became the Storm's full-time starting quarterback.

Orlando Predators
Hippeard signed with the Orlando Predators for the 2015 season.

Tampa Bay Storm
On October 14, 2016, Hippeard was assigned to the Tampa Bay Storm during the dispersal draft. He threw for 3,506 yards and 80 touchdowns in 2017, earning AFL MVP, Offensive Player of the Year and First Team All-Arena honors. He helped the Storm advance to ArenaBowl XXX, where they lost to the Philadelphia Soul by a score of 44–40. The Storm folded in December 2017.

Baltimore Brigade
On March 20, 2018, Hippeard was assigned to the Baltimore Brigade.

Atlantic City Blackjacks
On March 22, 2019, Hippeard was assigned to the Atlantic City Blackjacks.

AFL statistics

Stats from ArenaFan:

References

External links

Virginia–Wise Highland Cavaliers bio
Arena Football League bio

1985 births
Living people
American football quarterbacks
Virginia–Wise Cavaliers football players
Knoxville NightHawks players
Columbus Lions players
Tampa Bay Storm players
Orlando Predators players
Baltimore Brigade players
People from Stafford, Virginia
American expatriate players of American football 
American expatriate sportspeople in Switzerland